David Worth may refer to:

 David Worth (cinematographer), American cinematographer and director
 David Worth Clark (1902–1955), US politician
 David W. Dennis (1912–1999), US politician
 David W. Bagley (1883–1960), US Navy admiral
 David Worth, a fictional character in the film Cube